Sing: Original Motion Picture Soundtrack is the soundtrack to the 2016 animated musical film Sing. The soundtrack includes classic songs performed by the film's main cast as well as the song "Faith", which was written specifically for the movie and performed by Stevie Wonder and Ariana Grande. The soundtrack was released by Republic Records on December 9, 2016, while the film was released on December 21, 2016.

The film's score was composed by Joby Talbot.

Track listing

Standard edition

Deluxe edition

Charts

Weekly charts

Year-end charts

Certifications

References

External links
 Soundtracks for Sing at Internet Movie Database
 Original soundtrack song lyrics

2016 soundtrack albums
Republic Records soundtracks
Musical film soundtracks
Comedy film soundtracks